Aysha is a town in Ethiopia. It is situated about 36 kilometres (22 miles) South of the border with Djibouti and 20 km (12 mi) West of the border with Somalia. Located in the Shinile Zone in the Somali Region. This town served by a station on the Addis Ababa - Djibouti Railway.

Massacre 
The Aysha massacre was a massacre of ethnic Issa Somalis by Ethiopian army on 13 August 1960 in Aysha, Ethiopia. The Ethiopian troops had descended on the area to reportedly help defuse clan-related conflict. However, according to eye-witness testimony, that Somali men were then taken to a different location and then executed by Ethiopian soldiers. Among the latter, those who fled to Dikhil and Ali Sabieh in Djibouti.

Climate
Aysha has a hot desert climate (BWh) in Köppen-Geiger system.

References 

Populated places in the Somali Region